Haci Arif Bey (1831-1885) was a Circassian Turkish composer from Istanbul, most known for his compositions in the şarkı form, the most common secular form in Turkish classical music. He was a very prolific composer, who on some days, composed
more than 6-7 songs. From his third wife Nigârnik Hanım he has 4 great grandchildren; Turkish Diplomat Reha Aytaman, Şira Arıkoğlu, Okşan Aytaman and Murat Aytaman.

Biography 
He was born in the Eyüp district of Istanbul. He was taught by the famous Dede Efendi. After Sultan Abdülmecid I became aware of his beautiful voice, he was admitted to the Muzika-yi Humayun, which was the Imperial Military Music School in the Ottoman Empire. Due to his closeness to the Sultan, he was
responsible for teaching music to the women in the harem. He fell in love with one of the Circassian concubines, Çeşm-i Dilber, and had two children with her. He composed several songs after she left him for a merchant. His next wife from the harem also met with a  death from tuberculosis, also a cause for several songs by Arif Bey. He was elected the head singer in the palace, and married a third time with Circassian Nigârnik Hanım, and stayed with her until his death.

Toward the end of his life, Haci Arif Bey had a fall out with the emperor Abdul Hamid II at the time, and was jailed for about 50 days. While there, he composed several songs, which were later appreciated by Abdul Hamid II, and he was forgiven. He taught at the Imperial Music School for the rest of his life.

Major works 
 Olmaz ilâç sine-i sad pâreme
 Bakmıyor çeşm-i siyah feryâde
 Vücud ikliminin sultanı sensin
 Meyhanemi bu, bezm-i tarahhane-i cem mi 
 Çekme elem-i derdini bu dehr-i fenanın 
 Deva yokmuş neden bimarı aşka 
 Geçti zahm-i tîri hicrin ta dil-i naşadıma
 İltimas etmeye yâre varınız
 Gözümden gitmiyor bir dem hayalin
 Kanlar döküyor derdin ile dide-i giryan 
 Hâtırımdan çıkmaz asla ahd u peymânın senin
 Sayd eyledi bu gönlümü bir gözleri âhû
 Gurub etti güneş dünya karardı 
 Çözülme zülfüme ey dil rüba, dil bağlayanlardan
 Ben buy-i vefa bekler iken sûy-i çemende 
 Humarı yok bozulmaz meclis-i meyhane-i aşkın 
 Tasdî edeyim yari biraz da sühanimle 
 Bir halet ile süzdü yine çeşmini dildar 
 Esti nesîm-i nevbahar açıldı güller subh dem

References 
 Who is Who - Hacı Arif Bey (1831 - 1885)
 Culture and Tourism Ministry of Turkey - Biography of Hacı Arif Bey

Composers of Ottoman classical music
Composers of Turkish makam music
1831 births
Musicians from Istanbul
1885 deaths
Turkish classical composers
19th-century classical composers
Male classical composers
19th-century male musicians
Burials at Eyüp Cemetery